Pierluigi Tami (born 12 September 1961) is a Swiss football manager and a former defender. He also holds Italian citizenship.

Career
He was in charge of the Switzerland national under-21 football team, and also worked as an assistant to coach Ottmar Hitzfeld during his time as manager of the Switzerland national football team. In 2011, he won the award for Swiss football coach of the year. Tami coached the Swiss under-23 team at the 2012 Summer Olympics held in London.

Tami played for FC Chiasso, FC Locarno, AC Bellinzona, and FC Lugano in a career that saw him spend his entire time in the Italian speaking part of Switzerland. He previously coached Lugano, Locarno, and the Switzerland national under-17 football team.

References

External links
 Swiss Football Federation profile
 

1961 births
Living people
Swiss men's footballers
Italian footballers
Swiss people of Italian descent
Swiss football managers
Italian football managers
AC Bellinzona players
FC Chiasso players
FC Locarno players
FC Lugano players
FC Lugano managers
FC Locarno managers
Grasshopper Club Zürich managers
Association football defenders
Italian expatriate football managers